Yves Lenaerts (born 27 February 1983 in Turnhout) is a retired Belgian football goalkeeper who last played for ASV Geel.

Previous clubs
Turnhout (youth), PSV Eindhoven (2002–04), Heusden-Zolder (2004–06)  Club Brugge.

References

External links
 

1983 births
Living people
Sportspeople from Turnhout
Belgian footballers
Belgian Pro League players
Challenger Pro League players
Eredivisie players
Club Brugge KV players
PSV Eindhoven players
Oud-Heverlee Leuven players
AS Verbroedering Geel players
Association football goalkeepers
Footballers from Antwerp Province